Ohio Township is a township in Saline County, Kansas, in the United States.

Ohio Township was organized in 1871.

References

Townships in Saline County, Kansas
Townships in Kansas